Bernardo Domínguez Fernández (born 6 July 1979), known simply as Bernardo, is a Spanish former professional footballer who played as a goalkeeper.

Club career
Born in Zafra, Province of Badajoz, Bernardo started playing professionally with Real Oviedo. In the 1999–2000 season he was part the club's La Liga roster, but would only appear officially with the reserves during his spell in Asturias, subsequently resuming his career in Segunda División B.

In 2005, Bernardo returned to the professionals with Deportivo Alavés in Segunda División, who loaned him for two seasons to fellow league side CD Tenerife. He was first-choice in three of those four campaigns – being relegated in 2008–09 with the Basques – then backed up Vicente Guaita and Fabri at Recreativo de Huelva (also in that level) for two years.

In the summer of 2011, Bernardo joined SD Huesca of the second tier. He was released in the following transfer window, joining Dunfermline Athletic in early April 2012 and being Jim Jefferies' first signing as team manager.

Bernardo made his Scottish Premier League on the final day of the season in a 1–2 home loss against Kilmarnock, but left the club a week later when his short-term contract expired. Subsequently, he spent two years as backup in second-tier's CD Mirandés.

References

External links

1979 births
Living people
People from Zafra
Sportspeople from the Province of Badajoz
Spanish footballers
Footballers from Extremadura
Association football goalkeepers
Segunda División players
Segunda División B players
Tercera División players
Real Oviedo Vetusta players
Orihuela CF players
SD Huesca footballers
Deportivo Alavés players
CD Tenerife players
Recreativo de Huelva players
CD Mirandés footballers
SD Leioa players
Scottish Premier League players
Dunfermline Athletic F.C. players
Spanish expatriate footballers
Expatriate footballers in Scotland
Spanish expatriate sportspeople in Scotland